Keyshawn Woods (born January 28, 1996) is an American professional basketball player who plays for Tindastóll of the Úrvalsdeild karla. He played collegiately for Charlotte, Wake Forest and Ohio State.

College career
Woods averaged 8.4 points per game as a freshman at Charlotte. Following the season he transferred to Wake Forest. As a sophomore, Woods averaged 12.5 points, 4.2 rebounds and 3.5 assists per game. He averaged 12 points per game as a junior with a season high 25 points against Georgia Southern. Following the season, Woods transferred again to Ohio State. As a senior at Ohio State, Woods started 15 games and averaged 8.1 points, 2.5 assists and 3.1 rebounds per game while shooting 42 percent from the field.

Professional career
On August 11, 2019, Woods signed with Feyenoord Basketball for the 2019–20 season. He averaged 16.7 points, 4.6 rebounds and 3.6 assists per game. 

On September 8, 2020, he has signed with Polski Cukier Toruń of the Polish Basketball League (PLK).

On July 2, 2021, he signed with GTK Gliwice of the Polish Basketball League. Woods averaged 11.6 points, 3.1 assists, 2.9 rebounds, and 1.0 steal per game. He parted ways with the team on November 30. 

On February 19, 2022, Woods signed with Iraklis of the Greek Basket League. In 5 games, he averaged 13.2 points, 2.8 rebounds and 2.2 assists, shooting with 46% from the 3-point line and playing around 30 minutes per contest.

In August 2022, Woods signed with Tindastóll of the Úrvalsdeild karla.

References

External links
 Keyshawn Woods on RealGM

1996 births
Living people
American expatriate basketball people in Greece
American expatriate basketball people in the Netherlands
American expatriate basketball people in Poland
American men's basketball players
Basketball players from North Carolina
Charlotte 49ers men's basketball players
Dutch Basketball League players
Feyenoord Basketball players
GTK Gliwice players
Iraklis Thessaloniki B.C. players
Ohio State Buckeyes men's basketball players
Shooting guards
Ungmennafélagið Tindastóll men's basketball players
Úrvalsdeild karla (basketball) players
Wake Forest Demon Deacons men's basketball players